= Pierre Orelus =

Pierre Wilbert Orelus is a researcher and author on topics including multiculturalism, gender, neocolonialism, language, and race. He has authored and co-authored several books, and has written numerous articles since completing his doctorate from the University of Massachusetts-Amherst in 2008.. His published books include, The Race Talk: Identity politics, multiculturalism, and the hegemony of whiteness, Whitecentricism and Linguoracism Exposed, and Radical Voices of Democratic Schooling: Exposing neoliberal inequalities among other titles.

His professional career includes teaching at college universities in topics of education and philosophy. He currently holds the chair position in the Educational Studies and Teacher Preparation program in the Graduate School of Education and Allied Professions, at Fairfield University in Fairfield, Connecticut. In the past, he was a professor at New Mexico State University (NMSU), where he received the NMSU Dean of Education Award for Excellence in Research, as well as other awards and fellowships
